Gilberto Barbosa Nunes Filho (born 19 September 1989, in Rio Grande do Sul, Brazil) is a Brazilian professional footballer who plays for FC Juárez of Ascenso MX.

External links
Ascenso MX

Living people
1989 births
Brazilian footballers
Sportspeople from Rio Grande do Sul
Liga MX players
Brazilian expatriate footballers
Expatriate footballers in Mexico
Association football defenders
21st-century Brazilian people